The 2004 Mobil 1 12 Hours of Sebring was the 52nd running of this auto racing event, and took place on March 20, 2004.  This was also the opening race of the 2004 American Le Mans Series season.

Official results

Class winners in bold.  Cars failing to complete 70% of winner's distance marked as Not Classified (NC).

Statistics
 Pole Position - #38 ADT Champion Racing - 1:48.710
 Fastest Lap - #38 ADT Champion Racing 1:49.443
 Distance - 
 Average Speed -

External links
 

Sebring
12 Hours of Sebring
12 Hours of Sebring
12 Hours Of Sebring
12 Hours Of Sebring